The sarcophagus of Eshmunazar II is a 6th-century BC sarcophagus unearthed in 1855 in the "Phoenician Necropolis", a hypogeum complex southeast of the city of Sidon in modern-day Lebanon. The sarcophagus was discovered by Alphonse Durighello, a treasure hunter engaged by Antoine-Aimé Péretié, the chancellor of the French consulate in Beirut. The sarcophagus was sold to Honoré de Luynes, a wealthy French nobleman and scholar, and was subsequently removed to the Louvre after the resolution of a legal dispute over its ownwership. The sarcophagus has two sets of Phoenician inscriptions, one on its lid and another on its trough, under the sarcophagus head. The inscription was of great significance upon its discovery as it was the first Phoenician language inscription to be discovered in Phoenicia proper, the most detailed Phoenician text ever found anywhere up to that point, and is today the second longest extant Phoenician inscription after the Karatepe biligual inscription.

Eshmunazar II (Phoenician:  , a theophoric name meaning 'Eshmun helps') was a Phoenician King of Sidon and the son of King Tabnit. His sarcophagus was likely carved in Egypt from local amphibolite, and captured as booty by the Sidonians during their participation in Cambyses II's conquest of Egypt in 525 BC.

More than a dozen scholars across Europe and the United States rushed to translate the sarcophagus inscriptions. French orientalist Jean-Joseph-Léandre Bargès noted the similarities between the Phoenician language and Hebrew. The translation allowed scholars to identify the king buried inside, his lineage, and his construction feats. The inscription warns against disturbing Eshmunazar II's place of repose; it also recounts that the "Lord of Kings", the Achaemenid king, granted Eshmunazar II the territories of Dor, Joppa, and Dagon in recognition for his services.

The discovery led to great enthusiasm for archaeological research in the region, and was the primary reason for Ernest Renan's 1860-61 Mission de Phénicie, the first major archaeological mission to Lebanon and Syria.

Eshmunazar II 

Eshmunazar II (Phoenician: , a theophoric name meaning 'Eshmun helps') was a Phoenician King of Sidon, the son of Tabnit, and a vassal king of the Achaemenid Empire. Tabnit died before the birth of Eshmunazar II, and Amoashtart ruled in the interlude until the birth of her son, then was co-regent until he reached adulthood. Eshmunazar II died at the premature age of 14, whereafter he was succeeded by his cousin Bodashtart.

History

Phoenician funerary practices 
The Phoenicians emerged as a distinct culture on the Levantine coast in the Late Bronze Age as one of the successor cultures to the Canaanites. They were organized into independent city-states that shared a common language, culture, and religious practices. They had, however, diverse mortuary practices that included inhumation and cremation. 

Archaeological evidence of elite Achaemenid period burials abounds in the hinterland of Sidon. These include inhumations in underground vaults, rock-cut niches, and shaft and chamber tombs in Sarepta, Ain al-Hilweh, Ayaa, Mgharet Abloun, and the Temple of Eshmun. Elite Phoenician burials were characterized by the use of sarcophagi, and a consistent emphasis on the integrity of the tomb. Surviving mortuary inscriptions from that period invoke deities to assist with the procurement of blessings, and to conjure curses and calamities on whoever desecrated the tomb. 

The first record of the discovery of an ancient necropolis in Sidon was made in 1816 by English explorer and Egyptologist William John Bankes.

Modern discovery 
The sarcophagus of Eshmunazar II was discovered on 19 January 1855 by the workmen of Alphonse Durighello, an agent hired to hunt for treasure for Antoine-Aimé Péretié, an amateur archaeologist and the chancellor of the French consulate in Beirut. Durighello's men were digging in the grounds of an ancient necropolis (dubbed by Renan Nécropole Phénicienne) in the plains southeast of the city of Sidon. The sarcophagus was found outside a hollowed-out rocky mound that was known to locals as Magharet Abloun 'The Cavern of Apollo'. It was protected by a vault, of which some stones still remained in place. One tooth, a piece of bone, and a human jaw were found in the rubble during the sarcophagus extraction.

On 20 February 1855, Durighello informed Péretié of the find. Durighello had taken advantage of the absence of laws governing archaeological excavation and the disposition of the finds under the Ottoman rule over Lebanon, and had been involved in the lucrative business of trafficking archaeological artifacts. Under the Ottomans, it sufficed to either own the land or to have the owner's permission to excavate. Any finds resulting from digs became the property of the finder. To excavate, Durighello had bought the exclusive right from the land owner, the then Mufti of Sidon Mustapha Effendi. 

Cornelius Van Alen Van Dyck, an American missionary physican made it to the scene and made a transcript of the inscription which was first published in The Journal of Commerce.

Ownership dispute 

Durighello's ownership of the sarcophagus was contested by the British vice-consul general in Syria, Habib Abela. The matter quickly took a political turn; in a letter dated 21 April 1855 the director of the French national museums, Count Émilien de Nieuwerkerke requested the intervention of Édouard Thouvenel, the French Ambassador to the Ottomans, stating that "It is in the best interest of the museum to possess the sarcophagus as it adds a new value at a time in which we start studying with great zeal Oriental antiquities, until now unknown in most of Europe." A commission was appointed by the Governor of the Sidon Eyalet Wamik Pasha to look into the case, and, according to the minutes of the meeting dated 24 April 1855, the dispute resolution was transferred to a commission of European residents that unanimously voted in favor of Durighello.

De Luynes donated the sarcophagus to the French government to be exhibited in the Louvre.

Removal to the Louvre 
Péretié rushed the sarcophagus' laborious transportation to France. The bureaucratic task of removing the sarcophagus to France was facilitated with the intervention of Ferdinand de Lesseps, then consul-general of France in Alexandria, and the French Minister of Education and Religious Affairs, Hippolyte Fortoul. During the transportation to the Sidon port, the citizens and the governor of Sidon gathered, escorted, and applauded the convoy; they adorned the sarcophagus with flowers and palm branches while 20 oxen, assisted by French sailors, dragged tjhe carriage to the port. At the wharf, the crew of the French navy corvette La Sérieuse boarded the sarcophagus' trough, and then its lid onto a barge, before lifting it to the military corvette. The corvette commander, Delmas De La Perugia read an early translation of the inscriptions, explaining the scientific importance and historical significance of the cargo to his crew.

The sarcophagus of King Eshmunazar II is housed in the Louvre's Near Eastern antiquities section in room 311 of the Sully wing. It was given the museum identification number of AO 4806.

Description 

The Egyptian anthropoid-style sarcophagus dates to the 6th-century BC, it is made of a solid, well polished block of bluish-black amphibolite.

The lid displays a relief carving of the figure of a deceased person in the style of the Egyptian mummy sarcophagi. The effigy of the deceased is portrayed smiling, wrapped up to the neck in a thick shroud, leaving the head uncovered. The effigy is dressed with a large Nubian wig, a false braided beard, and an Usekh collar ending with falcon heads at each of its extremities, as is often seen at the neck of Egyptian mummies.

Two other sarcophagi of the same style were also unearthed in the necropolis.

Inscriptions 
The Egyptian-style sarcophagus was free from hieroglyphs; it had however 22 lines of 40 to 55 letters each of Phoenician text on its lid. The lid inscriptions occupy a square situated under the sarcophagus' Usekh collar and measure  in length and width. A second inscription, carved more delicately and uniformly , was found around the head curvature on the trough of the sarcophagus. It measures  in length and consists of six lines and a fragment of a seventh line. As is customary for Phoenician writing, all the characters are written without spaces separating each word except for a space in line 13 of the lid inscription, which divides the text into two equal parts. The lines of the text are not straight and are not evenly spaced. The letters in the lower part of the text (after the lacuna on line 13) is neater and smaller than the letters in the first part of the inscription.

The sarcophagus trough inscriptions correspond in size and style to the letters of the second part of the lid inscriptions. The letters are carved close together on the sixth line, and the text breaks off on the seventh line, consisting of nine characters that form the beginning of the text that begins after the lacuna on the 13th line of the lid inscription. De Luynes and Turner believe that the inscription was free-hand traced directly on the stone without the use of typographic guides for letter-spacing, and that these tracings were followed by the carving artisan. The letters of the first three lines of the lid inscription are cut deeper and rougher than the rest of the text which indicates that the sculptor was either replaced or made to work more neatly.

The external surface of the sarcophagus trough bears an isolated group of two Phoenician characters. De Luynes believes that they may have been trial carving marks made by the engraver of the inscription.

The inscriptions of the sarcophagus of Eshmunazar are known to scholars as CIS I 3 and KAI 14; they are written in the Phoenician language using the Phoenician alphabet. They identify the king buried inside, tell of his lineage and temple construction feats, and warn against disturbing him in his repose. The inscriptions also state that the "Lord of Kings" (the Achaemenid King of Kings) granted the Sidonian king "Dor and Joppa, the mighty lands of Dagon, which are in the plain of Sharon" in recognition of his deeds. According to Gibson the inscription "offers an unusually high proportion of literary parallels with the Hebrew Bible, especially its poetic sections". French orientalist Jean-Joseph-Léandre Bargès wrote that the language of the inscription is "identical with Hebrew, except for the final inflections of a few words and certain expressions."

As in other Phoenician inscriptions, the text seems to use no, or hardly any, matres lectionis, the letters that indicate vowels in Semitic languages. As in Aramaic, the preposition אית (ʾyt) is used as an accusative marker, while את (ʾt) is used for "with".

Translations 

Copies of the inscriptions were sent to scholars across the world. Translations of the sarcophagus of Eshmunazar II inscriptions were published by well-known scholars (see below table). Several other scholars worked on the translation, including the polymath Josiah Willard Gibbs, Hebrew language scholar William Henry Green, Biblical scholars James Murdock and Williams Jenks, and Syriac language expert Christian Frederic Crusé. American missionaries William McClure Thomson and Eli Smith who were living in Ottoman Syria at the time of the discovery of the sarcophagus successfully translated most of the inscription by early 1855, but did not produce any publications.

Belgian semitist Jean-Claude Haelewyck provided a hypothetical vocalization of the Phoenician text. A definitive vocalization is not possible because Phoenician is written without matres lectionis. Haelewyck based the premise of his vocalization on the affinity of the Phoenician and Hebrew languages, historical grammar, and ancient transcriptions.

A list of early published translations is below:

English translation

Dating and attribution 
The Egyptian-style sarcophagi found in Sidon were originally made in Egypt for members of the Ancient Egyptian elite, but were then transported to Sidon and repurposed for the burial of Sidonian royalty. The manufacture of this style of sarcophagi in Egypt ceased around 525 BC with the fall of the 26th dynasty.  Gibson and later scholars believe that the sarcophagi were captured as booty by the Sidonians during their participation in Cambyses II's conquest of Egypt in 525 BC. Herodotus recounts an event in which Cambyses II "ransacked a burial ground at Memphis, where coffins were opened up and the dead bodies they contained were examined", possibly providing the occasion on which the sarcophagi were removed and reappropriated by his Sidonian subjects.

Whereas the Tabnit sarcophagus, belonging to the father of Eshmunazar II, reemployed a sarcophagus already dedicated on its front with a long Egyptian inscription in the name of an Egyptian general, the sarcophagus used for Eshmunazar II was new and was inscribed with a full-length dedication in Phoenician on a clean surface. According to French archaeologist and epigrapher René Dussaud, the sarcophagus may have been ordered by his surviving mother, Queen Amoashtart, who arranged for the inscription to be made.

These sarcophagi (a third one probably belonged to Queen Amoashtart), are the only Egyptian sarcophagi that have ever been found outside of Egypt.

Significance

Significance of the inscription 

The lid inscription was of great significance upon its discovery; it was the first Phoenician language inscription to be discovered in Phoenicia proper. Furthermore, this engraving forms the longest and most detailed Phoenician inscription ever found anywhere up to that point, and is now the second longest extant Phoenician inscription after the Karatepe bilingual.

The discovery of the Magharet Abloun hypogeum and of Eshmunazar II's sarcophagus caused a sensation in France, which led Napoleon III, then-emperor of France, to dispatch a scientific mission to Lebanon headed by Semitic philologist and biblical scholar Ernest Renan.

Stylistic impact on local sarcophagi
The sarcophagi of Tabnit and Eshmunazar may have served as a model for the later sarcophagi of Sidon. After Tabnit and Eshmunazar II, sarcophagi continued to be used by Phoenician dignitaries, but with marked stylistic evolutions. These local anthropoid sarcophagi, built from the 5th century BC to the first half of the 4th century BC, continued to be carved in the form of a smooth, shapeless body, but used white marble, and the faces were progressively sculpted in more realistic Hellenic styles. It is uncertain whether they were imported from Greece or produced locally. This type of Phoenician sarcophagi has been found in the ruins of Phoenician colonies throughout the Mediterranean.

See also
 Temple of Eshmun - Ancient temple complex built by Eshmunazar II.
Alexander Sarcophagus - Ancient sarcophagus discovered in the royal necropolis of Sidon.
Lycian sarcophagus of Sidon - Ancient sarcophagus discovered in the royal necropolis of Sidon.
Ford Collection sarcophagi - A collection of ancient anthropoid Phoenician sarcophagi unearthed in Sidon.

Notes

References

Citations

Sources 

 

 
 

 

 
 
 
 

 

 
 
 

 
 

 
 

Commerce correspondent

External links

6th-century BC works
1855 archaeological discoveries
Kings of Sidon
Phoenician inscriptions
KAI inscriptions
Ancient Near East steles
Sarcophagi
Phoenician sarcophagi
Archaeology of the Achaemenid Empire
1855 in the Ottoman Empire
Phoenician alphabet
Near East and Middle East antiquities of the Louvre
France–Lebanon relations
Archaeological artifacts